Ogawa is a Japanese surname.

Ogawa may also refer to:

Places
 Ogawa, Ibaraki (Higashiibaraki)-machi, town incorporated into Omitama City, Ibaraki Prefecture
 Ogawa, Ibaraki (Naka)-mura, village incorporated into Hitachiōta City, Ibaraki Prefecture
 Ogawa, Kumamoto-machi, town incorporated into Uki City, Kumamoto Prefecture
 Ogawa, Nagano-mura, village in Kamiminochi District, Nagano Prefecture
 Ogawa, Saitama-machi, town in Hiki District, Saitama Prefecture
 Ogawa, Tochigi-machi, town incorporated into Nakagawa Town, Nasu District, Tochigi Prefecture
 Ogawa-machi (or Ogawa-chō), town incorporated into Iwaki City, Fukushima Prefecture

Companies
 Ogawa Seiki model aircraft engine company, founded by Shigeo Ogawa